The Christmas in You was released on 16 November 2005 and is a Christmas album from Swedish pop and country singer Jill Johnson. The album was recorded in Nashville, Tennessee in the United States. It peaked at number three on the Swedish Albums Chart.

Track listing
The Christmas in You
The Angels Cried
What Child Is This?
Blue December
Merry Christmas To You
Blame it on Christmas
Winter in July
Have Yourself a Merry Little Christmas
First Christmas in You 
The Christmas Song
O Come All Ye Faithful (Adeste Fideles)
I Bring Christmas Back to You
I Want You for Christmas
I Wanna Wish You All a Merry Christmas
Down to the River to Pray

2008 bonus tracks
16. When Christmas Was Mine
17. Big Bag Of Money

Charts

Weekly charts

Year-end charts

References

2005 Christmas albums
Jill Johnson albums
Christmas albums by Swedish artists
Country Christmas albums